USS Bulwark (AMc-68) was an Accentor-class coastal minesweeper acquired by the U.S. Navy for the dangerous task of removing mines from minefields laid in the water to prevent ships from passing.

Bulwark was laid down on 15 April 1941 at East Boothbay, Maine, by Hodgden Bros. & Goudy & Stevens; launched on 6 October 1941; sponsored by Miss Barbara Small; and placed in service at Boston, Massachusetts, on 5 February 1942.

World War II service 

Assigned to the section base at Boston, Bulwark spent her entire Navy career patrolling the waters of the 1st Naval District. She searched for submarines in coastal waters and for enemy offensive mines in those same areas. The warship also served as a training platform for minesweeping students based at Provincetown, Massachusetts.

Post-war inactivation 

Bulwark was placed out of service at the Boston Naval Shipyard on 18 June 1946. Her name was struck from the Navy list on 3 July 1946, and she was sold to the city of Boston on 12 September 1946.

References

External links 
 NavSource Online: Mine Warfare Vessel Photo Archive - Bulwark (AMc 68) - ex-Combat

 

Accentor-class minesweepers
Ships built in Boothbay, Maine
1941 ships
World War II minesweepers of the United States